Alain David (26 January 1932 – 24 July 2022) was a French sprinter who competed in the 1956 Summer Olympics. He was born in Luxembourg City.

References

External links
 

1932 births
2022 deaths
Sportspeople from Luxembourg City
French male sprinters
Olympic athletes of France
Athletes (track and field) at the 1955 Mediterranean Games
Athletes (track and field) at the 1956 Summer Olympics
Mediterranean Games gold medalists for France
Mediterranean Games silver medalists for France
Mediterranean Games bronze medalists for France
Athletes (track and field) at the 1959 Mediterranean Games
Mediterranean Games medalists in athletics